The 1960 Denver Broncos season was the team's inaugural year in the American Football League. Led by head coach Frank Filchock, the Broncos recorded four wins, nine losses, and one tie, finishing last in the AFL's Western Division.

Personnel

Staff

Roster

Regular season

Standings

External links 
 1960 Denver Broncos Statistics & Players – Pro-Football-Reference.com

Denver Broncos seasons
Denver Broncos
1960 in sports in Colorado